"Love d'un voyou" is a song by Fababy featuring additional vocals by Malian-French singer Aya Nakamura released in 2015.

Charts

Weekly charts

Year-end charts

References

2015 singles
French-language songs
2015 songs